Alessia Morani (born 3 January 1976) is an Italian politician.

Born in Sassocorvaro, in 2001 Morani graduated in law at the University of Urbino. Between 2006 and 2013 she was a member of the board of directors of Pesaro Studi,  Fondazione Occhialini and  Fano Ateneo. From 2003 to 2009 Morani served  as an advisor and councilor in Macerata Feltria, and from 2009 to 2013 she held the office of councilor for technical education at the Province of Pesaro and Urbino.

She was elected at the Italian parliament in February 2013 with the Democratic Party.

References

External links 

Italian Parliament - Alessia Morani

1976 births
Living people
People from the Province of Pesaro and Urbino
Democrats of the Left politicians
Democratic Party (Italy) politicians
Deputies of Legislature XVII of Italy
Deputies of Legislature XVIII of Italy
21st-century Italian women politicians
University of Urbino alumni
Women members of the Chamber of Deputies (Italy)